This is the list of cathedrals in Zimbabwe sorted by denomination.

Roman Catholic 
Cathedrals of the Roman Catholic Church in Zimbabwe:
Cathedral of the Immaculate Conception in Bulawayo|
Cathedral of St Theresa in Gweru
Cathedral of the Sacred Heart in Harare
 Cathedral of Ss Peter and Paul in Masvingo
Holy Trinity Cathedral in Mutare

Anglican
Cathedrals of the Church of the Province of Central Africa in Zimbabwe:
 St Johns Cathedral in Bulawayo (Diocese of Matabeleland)
Anglican St Johns Cathedral
 St Cuthbert's Cathedral in Gweru
 Cathedral of Saint Mary and All Saints in Harare
 Cathedral of St John the Baptist in Mutare (Diocese of Manicaland)

See also
List of cathedrals
Christianity in Zimbabwe

References

Cathedrals in Zimbabwe
Zimbabwe
Cathedrals
Cathedraks